Lubomir "Luboš" Kolář (4 February 1929 – 2012) was a Czech basketball player.

National team career
With the senior Czechoslovakian national team, Kolář competed in the men's tournament at the 1952 Summer Olympics. With Czechoslovakia, he also won the silver medal at the 1955 EuroBasket, and the bronze medal at the 1957 EuroBasket.

References

External links
FIBA Profile

1929 births
2012 deaths
Czech men's basketball players
Olympic basketball players of Czechoslovakia
Basketball players at the 1952 Summer Olympics
Place of birth missing